Big Bang is the debut album by the American metal band Magdallan, released in 1992 through Intense Records.  Big Bang was nominated for one GMA Dove Award for Best Metal/Hard Rock Album in 1992, but did not win.

Track listing

Personnel
 Ken Tamplin - lead & backing vocals
 Lanny Cordola - lead, rhythm & acoustic guitars, sitar on "Wounded Hearts", "Dome of the Rock" & "Big Bang", mandolin on "Old Hard Line" 
 Ken Mary - drums

Additional personnel
 Brian Bromberg - bass
 Kim Bullard - keyboards
 James Christian - backing vocals on "Radio Bikini" & "Big Bang"
 Mark Stein - backing vocals on "Radio Bikini"
 The Peaches Trio - backing vocals on "Shake", "Old Hard Line" & "House of Dreams"

References 

1992 debut albums
Magdallan albums